Pitkin may refer to:

People
 Pitkin (surname)

Places
 Pitkin, Colorado, USA, a town in Gunnison County
 Pitkin County, Colorado, USA
 Pitkin, Louisiana, USA, a community in Vernon Parish
 The Pitkin Formation, a sedimentary rock layer

Fictional characters
 A character played by Sir Norman Wisdom

Other 
 Pitkin Publishing, an imprint of The History Press